Dana is a hamlet in Saskatchewan located and the intersection of Saskatchewan Highway 637 and Saskatchewan Highway 5.  The hamlet is an un-incorporated place within the Rural Municipality of Bayne.

The hamlet at one point in time was closely associated with the CFS Dana, a nearby military installation that closed in 1987.

References 

Bayne No. 371, Saskatchewan
Former villages in Saskatchewan
Unincorporated communities in Saskatchewan
Division No. 15, Saskatchewan